(You are torn loose, afflicted sinners), BWV 224, is a cantata by Johann Sebastian Bach. He composed it in Leipzig in 1724 for an unknown occasion. The author of the text is unknown and there are only 30 measures of aria for soprano extant, copied by C. P. E. Bach.

References 

Cantatas by Johann Sebastian Bach
1724 compositions